Agora Energiewende is a think tank supporting the Energiewende in Germany.

Its members debate under the Chatham House Rule and include Klaus Töpfer, Ottmar Edenhofer, and Claude Turmes.

In addition to studies specific to Germany, Agora have published an analysis on the economics of the proposed UK Hinkley Point C nuclear power plant. Its analyses are quoted as part of the energy debate in other countries, including Denmark.

In December 2021, Graichen also left office, like his predecessor, to join the now Federal Ministry of Economics and Climate Protection under Minister Robert Habeck (Greens) as a permanent State Secretary. In July 2022, Frauke Thies took over the management together with Markus Steigenberger and also serves as Executive Director.

References

External links

Environmental organisations based in Germany